There are at least 58 named mountains in Chouteau County, Montana.
 Antelope Butte, el. 
 Arrow Peak, el. 
 Black Butte, el. 
 Black Mountain, el. 
 Black Rock, el. 
 Buckskin Butte, el. 
 Carter Mountain, el. 
 Centennial Mountain, el. 
 Chase Hill, el. 
 Chimney Rock, el. 
 Chinaman Hill, el. 
 Churchill Butte, el. 
 Dark Butte, el. 
 Discovery Butte, el. 
 Dunbar Hill, el. 
 Eagle Buttes, el. 
 East Knee, el. 
 East Peak, el. 
 Flying A Butte, el. 
 Fortress Rock, el. 
 Fourmile Hill, el. 
 Goose Bill Butte, el. 
 Gossack Mountain, el. 
 Harris Mountain, el. 
 Hay Stack Coulee, el. 
 Haystack Butte, el. 
 Haystack Butte, el. 
 Haystack Butte, el. 
 Highwood Baldy, el. 
 Johnson Hill, el. 
 Libby Hills, el. 
 Lidstone Hill, el. 
 Little Bear Peak, el. 
 McNamara Butte, el. 
 Mount Hancock, el. 
 Mount Kennon, el. 
 Palisade Butte, el. 
 Parker Butte, el. 
 Prospect Peak, el. 
 Rattlesnake Butte, el. 
 Rattlesnake Butte, el. 
 Rattlesnake Butte, el. 
 Round Butte, el. 
 Round Top, el. 
 Ryan Butte, el. 
 Sawmill Butte, el. 
 Shaws Peak, el. 
 Shepherd Butte, el. 
 Square Butte, el. 
 Steamboat Rock, el. 
 Studhorse Butte, el. 
 Table Butte, el. 
 The Rock, el. 
 Tiger Butte, el. 
 Tox Hill, el. 
 West Knee, el. 
 Wild Horse Butte, el. 
 Windy Mountain, el.

See also
 List of mountains in Montana
 List of mountain ranges in Montana

Notes

Landforms of Chouteau County, Montana
Chouteau